Gnathotriche is a genus of butterflies in the family Nymphalidae found in South America.

Species
Gnathotriche exclamationis (Kollar, [1849]) (Venezuela, Colombia, Ecuador)
Gnathotriche mundina (Druce, 1876) (Peru, Colombia) – false altinote

References

Melitaeini
Butterfly genera
Taxa named by Baron Cajetan von Felder
Taxa named by Rudolf Felder